Hyotherium was an extinct genus of even-toed ungulates under the Hyotheriinae group (a group that also consists of Chicochoerus, Xenohyus and more) of the Suidae family. It existed during the Miocene in Europe and Perim Island, India. It was named by Von Mayer in 1834.

References 

Oligocene even-toed ungulates
Oligocene mammals of Europe
Miocene even-toed ungulates
Miocene mammals of Europe
Miocene mammals of Asia
Fossil taxa described in 1834
Prehistoric even-toed ungulate genera
Prehistoric Suidae